Dániel Illyés (born September 19, 1982 in Eger, Hungary) is a Hungarian footballer who most recently played for Atlanta Silverbacks in the North American Soccer League.

Career

Professional
Illyés spent eight years playing in the Hungarian leagues, playing for Újpest FC, Dabas FC (on loan), Rákospalotai EAC, Nyíregyháza Spartacus and Egri FC. He moved to America in 2012 to play for North American Soccer League club Atlanta Silverbacks.

References

External links
Atlanta Silverbacks bio

1982 births
Living people
Hungarian footballers
Hungarian expatriate footballers
Újpest FC players
Rákospalotai EAC footballers
Nyíregyháza Spartacus FC players
Atlanta Silverbacks players
Expatriate soccer players in the United States
North American Soccer League players
Association football goalkeepers
Sportspeople from Eger
21st-century Hungarian people